Tome Parish is an administrative unit of Ogre Municipality in the Semigallia region of Latvia (From 2009 until 2021, it was part of the former Ķegums Municipality).

History 
Tome's name "Thompus" was first mentioned in 1735. Until 1924, Tome Parish belonged to the Bauska, later to the Riga District. In 1935, Tome Parish had an area of 73 km2 and a population of 763 inhabitants. In 1945, Tome village council was established in the parish, which was abolished in 1947, but in 1949, with the abolition of the parish, it was re-established. In 1960, the Strēlnieku village was liquidated and the kolkhoz "Tome" territory was added to the Ķeguma workers' village, creating a "rural area of Ķegums". In 1993, Ķegums was granted city rights, but the rural territory was reorganized into "Tome Parish", which was liquidated again in 1994, adding Ķegums as a rural territory. In 2002, the city of Ķegums with a rural territory was reorganized into Ķegums Municipality. In 2010, the rural territory of Ķegums was reorganized into a separate administrative territory and renamed "Tomes Parish". The territory of Tome Parish is defined by law as a part of the region of Semigallia.

Hydrography 
Rivers: 
, 
, 
, 
, 
.

Towns, villages and settlements of Tome parish 

 (parish center), 
, 
, 
, 
, 
.

References

External links

Parishes of Latvia
Ogre Municipality
Semigallia